Firehouse Subs is an American restaurant chain based in Jacksonville, Florida. It was founded in 1994 by former firefighter brothers Chris and Robin Sorensen. 

Firehouse Subs has over 1,210 restaurants in 46 states, Puerto Rico, and Canada.

History 

Brothers Chris Sorensen and Robin Sorensen followed the same career path as their father Rob Sorensen, a 43-year veteran of the Jacksonville Fire and Rescue Department in Jacksonville, Florida. 

On October 10, 1994, the first Firehouse Subs restaurant opened in Jacksonville. Firehouse Subs first attempted franchising in 1995. Soon after, the founders decided to pull back on the idea, eventually buying back those franchised locations.  Instead, they chose to focus on operating company-owned stores only, especially in the Jacksonville area.

In 1998, Firehouse Subs surpassed 10 locations, and later that year opened the first location outside of Florida.

In 2000, the founders decided to take a different approach, using consultants to plan franchise growth. They were able to set up financing for potential franchisees. The second wave of franchising began in 2001.

In 2011, Firehouse Subs opened its first franchises in the U.S. territory of Puerto Rico, via local franchisee Caribbean Restaurants.

By 2012 the company had 500 locations, ending the year with nearly 600. In July 2016, Firehouse Subs opened its 1,000th location.

In 2015, Firehouse Subs opened its first locations in Canada, with its first location opening in Oshawa, Ontario in October with franchisee OnFire Restaurant Group. Currently, the group operates 50 Canadian restaurants, with plans to open a total of 90 in Ontario alone. The chain also launched a loyalty program.

In June 2017, Firehouse Subs opened its first airport location at Jacksonville International. In December 2017, the brand's second airport location opened at Orlando International. In April 2018, the chain opened its first on-campus location at Western New England University. In 2020 the chain opened a location at Jacksonville's Baptist Medical Center. 

On November 15, 2021, Restaurant Brands International announced that it would acquire Firehouse Subs for $1 billion. The acquisition was completed on December 15, 2021.

Restaurant concept and food 
Owning to the Sorensens' involvement in firefighting, the interior decor of Firehouse Subs locations are inspired by fire stations, and often include firefighter equipment and memorabilia. Each restaurant features a custom mural, hand drawn and painted at the company's headquarters in Jacksonville, Florida. The murals reflect fire and police service unique to each restaurant's community or town. No two of the more than 1,200 murals painted are the same.

Menu 
The menu, which features hot specialty subs, salads, and other seasonal items, takes inspiration from the firehouse with names like Hook & Ladder, Engineer, and Firehouse Hero. The subs are prepared with meats and cheeses, on toasted sub rolls, and served "Fully Involved" with vegetables and condiments. Chris and Robin remain in charge of the menu, and work alongside their director of product development Jay Miller, who joined the company in 2017.

See also 
 List of submarine sandwich restaurants

References

External links 
 

1994 establishments in Florida
2021 mergers and acquisitions
American companies established in 1994
Companies based in Jacksonville, Florida
Family-owned companies
Fast-food chains of the United States
Multinational companies based in Jacksonville
American subsidiaries of foreign companies
Restaurant Brands International
Restaurant chains in the United States
Restaurants established in 1994
Restaurants in Florida
Submarine sandwich restaurants